Mõrsjalinik is a novel by Estonian author Karl Ristikivi. It was first published in 1965 in Lund, Sweden by Eesti Kirjanike Kooperatiiv (Estonian Writers' Cooperative). In Estonia, it was published in 1992.

1965 novels
Novels by Karl Ristikivi